This is a list of all the United States Supreme Court cases from volume 405 of the United States Reports:

External links

1972 in United States case law